The 2013 West Coast Conference women's basketball tournament will be held March 6–11, 2013, at the Orleans Arena in the Las Vegas area community of Paradise, Nevada.

Format
For the second consecutive year the tournament will feature a 9-team single elimination format. The 1 and 2 seeds receive a bye to the semifinals while the 3 and 4 seeds receive a bye to the quarterfinals.  The tournament will begin on Wednesday, 6 March with an 8/9 game. The second round will take place on Thursday, 7 March. The tournament quarterfinals will be held on Friday, 8 March. The conference semifinals will be held on Saturday, 9 March. The first 4 rounds will all be broadcast on BYUtv Sports and shown online through the conferences web provider- Campus Insiders at WCC Digital. The championship game will be played on Monday, 11 March 2013 and will be broadcast on television by ESPNU.

Seeds

Schedule

Bracket and scores

Game Summaries

1st Round: San Francisco vs. Pepperdine
Series History: Pepperdine leads series 34-32
Broadcasters: Dave McCann, Steve Cleveland, and Jarom Jordan

2nd Round: Loyola Marymount vs. San Francisco 
Series History: Series even 31-31
Broadcasters: Dave McCann and Steve Cleveland (Play-by-play); Blaine Fowler and Jarom Jordan (Halftime and Bridge Show)

2nd Round: Santa Clara vs. Portland
Series History: Santa Clara leads series 34-28
Broadcasters: Dave McCann and Steve Cleveland (Play-by-play); Blaine Fowler and Jarom Jordan (Halftime)

Quarterfinals: BYU vs. Loyola Marymount
Series History: BYU leads series 5-1 
Broadcasters: Dave McCann and Blaine Fowler (Play-by-play); Steve Cleveland and Jarom Jordan (Halftime); Blaine Fowler, Steve Cleveland, and Jarom Jordan (Bridge Show)

Quarterfinals: Saint Mary's  vs. Portland
Series History: Saint Mary's leads series 35-20
Broadcasters: Dave McCann, Steve Cleveland, and Jarom Jordan

Semifinal: Gonzaga vs. BYU
Series History: Gonzaga leads series 6-5
Broadcasters: Dave McCann, Steve Cleveland, and Jarom Jordan

Semifinal: San Diego vs. Saint Mary's
Series History: Saint Mary's leads series 37-25
Broadcasters: Dave McCann, Steve Cleveland, and Jarom Jordan

Championship: Gonzaga vs. San Diego
Series History: Gonzaga leads series 44-20
Broadcasters: Rich Cellini and Rosalyn Gold-Onwude

All tournament conference team

See also
2012–13 NCAA Division I women's basketball season
West Coast Conference men's basketball tournament
2012–13 West Coast Conference men's basketball season
2013 West Coast Conference men's basketball tournament
2012–13 West Coast Conference women's basketball season
West Coast Conference women's basketball tournament

References

External links

Tournament
West Coast Conference women's basketball tournament
West Coast Conference women's basketball tournament
West Coast Conference women's basketball tournament
Basketball competitions in the Las Vegas Valley
College basketball tournaments in Nevada
Women's sports in Nevada
College sports tournaments in Nevada